K-12 was a state highway in the U.S. state of Kansas, created in the mid-1980s. Its alignment was changed during its existence.

History
K-12 was commissioned when the first section of the K-10 freeway was completed from K-7 in Olathe, Kansas to I-435 in Lenexa, Kansas. K-10, at the time, overlapped K-7 from K-12's western terminus in Olathe north to Shawnee Mission Parkway.

When the K-10 freeway segment from Lawrence to Olathe was completed, K-10 was signed for the entire length (both sections) of the expressway. At this time, K-12 was realigned north to replace the former K-10 alignment along the Shawnee Mission Parkway. It followed the parkway from K-7 in Shawnee, then turned north on Merriam Drive in Merriam, which follows into Kansas City, Kansas. Merriam Lane turns into Southwest Boulevard near US-169, and K-12 ended not far east at the Missouri state line.

Since K-12 existed entirely within the city limits of the cities it traverses, it was turned back to the cities in 1987 according to KDOT policy.

Junction list
Major junctions as listed shortly before K-12 was decommissioned in 1987.

Spur route

K-12 Spur was a  spur route that ran from K-12 east to Interstate 35 (I-35). Originally K-10 Spur, it was changed to K-12 Spur when the Shawnee Mission Parkway and Merriam Lane were changed from K-10 to K-12. K-12 Spur was withdrawn in 1987 along with K-12 itself.

References

External links

Kansas Department of Transportation State Map
KDOT: Historic State Maps
Kansas Highways Routelog (Highway 12) (accessed November 28, 2009)

012